Świętojańska, literally, "St. John's" may refer to the following streets:

Świętojańska Street in Bydgoszcz, Poland
, Poland 
, Poland 
, Poland 

pl:Ulica Świętojańska